Bina Kumari Shrestha (Nepali: बिना कुमारी श्रेष्ठ) is a Nepali politician and a member of the House of Representatives of the federal parliament of Nepal. She was elected under the proportional representation system from CPN UML, filling the reservation seat for indigenous groups as well as women. She is also a member of the parliamentary Development and Technology Committee.

References

Living people
21st-century Nepalese women politicians
21st-century Nepalese politicians
Communist Party of Nepal (Unified Marxist–Leninist) politicians
Nepal Communist Party (NCP) politicians
Nepal MPs 2017–2022
1957 births